Isayev, Isaev (masculine) or Isayeva, Isaeva (feminine) is a Russian language family name which means "(son) of Isai", with Isai being the Russian given name that corresponds to "Isaiah". Notable people with the surname include:

Aiday Isaeva (born 1989), Kazakh beauty pageant titleholder
Aleksei Isaev (engineer) (1908–1971), Russian rocket engineer
Aleksey Isayev (born 1995), Russian association football player
Ali Isayev (born 1983), Azerbaijani wrestler
Anatoli Isayev (1932–2016), Soviet/Russian soccer player and coach
Andrey Isayev (born 1971), Russian politician
Arif İsayev (born 1985), Azerbaijani association football player
Daria Isaeva (born 1990), Russian volleyball player
Dimitri Isayev (1905–1930), Chuvash writer and critic
Dimitri Isayev (born 1973), Russian actor
Grigory Isayev (born 1943), Russian politician
Hasan Isaev (born 1952), Bulgarian freestyle wrestler
Ivan Isayev (born 1927), Russian Olympic shooter
Magomet Isayev (1928–2011), Russian Esperantist
Maksim Isayev, fictional Russian spy in Nazi Germany working under his undercover name of Max Otto von Stierlitz
Mansur Isaev (born 1986), Russian Olympic judoka
Nadira Isayeva, Russian journalist
Pyotr Isayev, better known as Petka, the aide-de-camp of Vasily Chapayev
Shamil Isayev (1964–2019), Russian association football player

Russian-language surnames
Patronymic surnames
Surnames from given names